Paige Pierce  is a professional disc golfer from Plano, Texas. She has won 5 World Championships and 15 total Major Championships, and has been consistently ranked among the top professional women since 2011. In 2018 she broke the record for the highest PDGA player rating a woman had ever achieved at 978. Since then she has broken her own record several times, most recently at 996 rated in March 2021. Her current rating as of June 2022 is 980. She is currently sponsored by Discraft and Grip Equipment.

Pierce began playing disc golf at the age of 4 with her father and his friends. She went professional in 2009 and started touring in 2010.

In addition to holding a number of PDGA National Tour wins, she is the all-time leading women's winner on the Disc Golf Pro Tour, founded 2016 by Jeff Spring, with 30 DGPT wins as of August 2021.

After winning the US Women's Disc Golf Championship in 2014, Pierce made history by becoming the first female to ever win the USDGC Performance Flight division. She narrowly missed qualifying for the Open division in 2015, missing a playoff for the fifth qualifying spot by two strokes. In 2017, she earned a qualification for USDGC at the Aussie Open. In 2018 she once again earned a qualifying spot when she won the United States Women's Disc Golf Championship.

Professional career

In addition to Pierce's five World Championships, she also holds two Mixed Doubles World Championships, both with Jeremy Koling.

Majors (15) 

Majors playoff record (0-1)

National Tour (27) 

NT playoff record (1-3)

Summary 

*As of January 1, 2017

Annual statistics

†At Year End

References

American disc golfers
Living people
1991 births
Sportspeople from Plano, Texas